Brennilis is a commune in the Finistère department of Brittany in northwestern France.

Geography

Climate
Brennilis has a oceanic climate (Köppen climate classification Cfb).

Population
Inhabitants of Brennilis are called Brennilisiens in French.

See also
Communes of the Finistère department
Brennilis Nuclear Power Plant
Parc naturel régional d'Armorique
Roland Doré sculptor

References

External links

Official website 

 Mayors of Finistère Association  

Communes of Finistère